The R515 road is a regional road in Ireland which runs from  east of Abbeyfeale in County Limerick to the N24 national secondary road in Tipperary Town. En route it passes through Dromcolliher, Charleville and Kilmallock.

See also
Roads in Ireland
National primary road
National secondary road

References
Roads Act 1993 (Classification of Regional Roads) Order 2006 – Department of Transport

Regional roads in the Republic of Ireland
Roads in County Limerick
Roads in County Cork
Roads in County Tipperary